Forrest or Forest Royal may refer to:

 Forrest B. Royal (1893–1945), a rear admiral in the United States Navy
 Dizzy Royal (Forest John Royal, 1914–1991), American baseball player
 , an American destroyer named after the admiral